Ross Creek is the main ocean tributary of Yeppoon, Queensland, on the Capricorn Coast. Beak Bridge crosses Ross Creek, connecting Yeppoon with Cooee Bay and other southern towns along Scenic Highway 10.

Community
While Ross Creek has no permanent population, it is a major community centre with a park, boat ramp, and public barbecues.  Markets at Ross Creek are held every month.  Ross Creek is best known for its fishing.

On the low tide, muddy sandbars on the southern side of the bridge are revealed, and are a popular place for pumping for yabbies.

On the incoming tide, the creek fills to near capacity.  Man-made stone walls on either side of the creek, plus a sandy beach at the mouth provide plentiful fishing spots. Whiting, flathead, and silver bream are common catches.

Flora and fauna
Sandy at its mouth, Ross Creek becomes muddier on the other side of the bridge and is popular for mud crabs.  Hectares of low lying land either side of Ross Creek fills at high tide, providing the perfect environment for mangroves to grow. In turn, the mangroves give shelter to crustaceans, prawns, and fish. Queensland Government studies have identified ten different species of mangrove in the Ross Creek-Fig Tree Creek system.

Ross Creek is also famous as a breeding ground for colonies of flying foxes. The mangroves provide a permanent home for approximately 2,000 black flying foxes (Pteropus alecto), as well as a seasonal camp for several hundred thousand little red flying foxes (Pteropus scapulatus).

History
Prior to Local Government Amalgamations in 2008, all areas on the Capricorn Coast were administered by Livingstone Shire Council but are now part of Rockhampton Region.

Several trawlers still berth in Ross Creek, the remnants of an intensive sea scallop fishing industry based at Ross Creek up until Rosslyn Bay took shape in the 1970s.

Also visible on the eastern wall by the creek mouth are the remains of a concrete-and-stone salt water pool that was built in the 1950s as a safe swimming place for children.

See also

 List of rivers of Australia

References

Coastal towns in Queensland
Rivers of Queensland
Central Queensland